The CONCACAF Caribbean/Central American Play-offs of 2002 FIFA World Cup qualification was contested between 6  CONCACAF members located in the Caribbean and Central American areas.

The 6 teams consisted of the 3 runners-up from the Caribbean zone, the 2 group runners-up from the Central American zone and Canada. The teams played in a knockout tournament, with matches on a home-and-away basis. The winners of each match advanced to the semi-finals round.

|}

First leg

Second leg

Canada won 1–0 on aggregate and advanced to the semi-final round.

Guatemala won 9–1 on aggregate and advanced to the semi-final round.

Honduras won 7–1 on aggregate and advance to the semi-final round.

References
 FIFA.com

Playoffs
2000 in Caribbean football
2000 in Canadian soccer
1999–2000 in Honduran football
1999–2000 in Guatemalan football